The Funicular de Santiago is a funicular railway on a slope of the San Cristóbal Hill, in the city of Santiago de Chile. It forms part of the tourist attractions of the Santiago Metropolitan Park.

History 
The idea of a funicular originated when the Cerro San Cristóbal began to be taken for public use in the 1910s, project that was finally commissioned to the Italian engineer Ernesto Bosso in 1922. The station located at the feet of the hill was designed by architect Luciano Kulczewski, while the strength of steel wire ropes was tested by engineer Jorge Alessandri, who later went on to become president of Chile (1958–1964).

Between July 11 and August 11, 1949 the service was suspended for repairs and maintenance. From 10 to 13 and from 17 to 20 July 1950, the funicular was closed to undergo repair works. In those years full fares ranged between $3.6 and $7.4, and the student fare was $2.

In 1968, the original wooden car roofs were replaced with canvas tops supported by metal frames. Pope John Paul II traveled in the funicular of Santiago during his only visit to Chile in 1987. The funicular was declared as a National Monument of Chile on  November 16, 2000.

In January 1998, the only serious accident occurred, when a car ascending to the Cumbre station —which carried six park employees— crashed against the hill due to a late brake activation. An employee lost his left arm and the front of the car involved was destroyed.

Gallery

References 

Transport in Santiago
Funicular railways in Chile